Reliance Film Company was an early movie studio in the United States. It was established in 1909 and was bought out a couple years later from Charles O. Baumann, Adam Kessel, and Charlie Kessel.

Actors at the studio included Madge Tyrone in the Mutual Girl serials, Claude Cooper (actor), and  Edgena De Lespine.

Harry Aitken purchased the Reliance Film Company in 1911 from Charles O. Baumann.

Directors at the studio included Hal Reid, Wallace Reid, and Edward Morrissey.

It published The Film, a weekly.

Max Davidson portrayed the character Izzy in a series of Reliance films in 1914.

History
The studio took over the offices of the Sanford White studio in Manhattan. It also operated a 10,000 sq ft factory on Coney Island.

Filmography
A Brass Button (1911)
Her Son (1911)
Votes for Women (film) (1912), about women's suffrage produced in partnership with the National American Woman Suffrage Association
The Rose Bush of Memories (1914)
The Huron Converts (1915) with Joseph Henabery
Man (1913 film), a Reliance film directed by Oscar Apfel starring James Ashley, Gertrude Robinson
Before the White Man Came
At Cripple Creek
The Victoria Cross (1912 film) (The Charge of the Light Brigade), directed by Hal Reid
A Man's Duty
The Secret Service Man
Curfew Shall Not Ring Tonight (1912)

His Mother's Son (1913)
Kaintuck (1912), a Kaintuck is a native of Kentucky
Virginius (film) (1912), based on the play by James Sheridan Knowles
The Second Mrs. Roebuck (1914)
The Great Leap; Until Death Do Us Part (1914)
The Three Brothers (1915 film) (1915)
Station Content (1915 film) (1915)
The Craven (1915)
Sympathy Sal (1915)
The Outlaw's Revenge (1915)
Macbeth
Rosanna's Dream
Solomon's Son
When Men Love
Invasion of the Wilderness
The Girl Who Waited
The Reckoning

References

Silent film studios